Steven E. de Souza (born November 17, 1947) is an American screenwriter, producer, and director of film and television widely known for writing blockbuster action films like Commando, Die Hard, and Judge Dredd. He is among a handful of screenwriters whose films have earned over US$2 billion at the worldwide box office.

Life and career
De Souza was born in Philadelphia, Pennsylvania on 1948, the son of Evelyn (Green) and H. Walton Henriques de Souza, a Jamaican, who owned a real estate company. He attended Pennsylvania State University, where he was a student of science fiction author Philip Klass (better known by his pseudonym William Tenn). He began his career as a story editor for primetime television series such as The Six Million Dollar Man and The Hardy Boys Mysteries, before graduating to the role of producer and writer. He produced the first season of Knight Rider, and was the creator of the short-lived sci-fi series The Powers of Matthew Star.

De Souza started his film career writing, directing, and producing the low-budget stoner comedy Arnold's Wrecking Co., which won the Special Jury Prize at the 1972 Atlanta Film Festival. Beginning in the early 1980s, he became a prolific screenwriter of feature films, specializing in blockbuster action and thriller films like Commando and Die Hard. He wrote some of the most successful films of the era, including 48 Hrs., The Running Man, The Flintstones, and Die Hard 2. He was frequently hired by studios as a script doctor in order to rewrite preexisting screenplays during production to add more action and humor. He has been nominated twice for the Edgar Allan Poe award, an award given to any piece of media for excellence in mystery writing. The first in 1984 for 48 Hrs. and again in 1989 for Die Hard. De Souza also "won" the 1991 Razzie Award for Worst Screenplay for Hudson Hawk. He wrote and directed the 1994 video game adaptation Street Fighter after being introduced to the franchise by his son. Though the film received negative critical reception and failed to spawn an intended franchise, it has since become a cult classic in some circles.

In 2000, he was honored with the Norman Lear Award for Lifetime Achievement in writing. In 2004, he received the Dr. Bird award, which is given for achievement in the arts to people of Jamaican descent. De Souza appeared in the feature-length documentary Dreams on Spec, which profiled three aspiring screenwriters and featured comments from a number of distinguished writers like James L. Brooks, Nora Ephron, Carrie Fisher, and him. His Web series Unknown Sender became a triple honoree at the 2009 Webby Awards for Best Writing, Best Dramatic Series, and Best Individual Performance.

In 2011, he teamed with Family Guy director Pete Michels for the Fox Network animated pilot "Spyburbia."

De Souza has also written for The New York Times, The Los Angeles Times and Premiere, Empire magazine, Buzz, and Fade In. Recently, he was responsible for the critically acclaimed graphic novel re-boot of the classic comic character Sheena, Queen of the Jungle.

Filmography
Film writer

Television

Awards and nominations 

Won
 2000 Norman Lear Award for Lifetime Achievement

References

External links

Short internet series Dead Link

1947 births
20th-century American screenwriters
21st-century American screenwriters
American people of Jamaican descent
American people of Portuguese descent
American male screenwriters
People from Bucks County, Pennsylvania
Film producers from Pennsylvania
American television writers
Pennsylvania State University alumni
Film directors from Pennsylvania
Living people
American male television writers
Screenwriters from Pennsylvania
Writers from Philadelphia
20th-century American male writers
21st-century American male writers